Kaare Engstad (July 17, 1906 – January 10, 1981) was a Canadian cross-country skier who competed in the 1932 Winter Olympics. In 1932 he finished 16th in the 50 kilometres competition.

References

External links
 Profile
 Cross-country skiing 1932 

1906 births
1981 deaths
Canadian male cross-country skiers
Olympic cross-country skiers of Canada
Cross-country skiers at the 1932 Winter Olympics